The Boo Crew (originally known as Thugaboo) is a series of children's animated television specials created by the Wayans Brothers. It was first aired on Nicktoons Network on August 11, 2006. To date, there have been two The Boo Crew specials. As of the year of 2017, both specials have been uploaded on YouTube by Shawn Wayans in the channel entitled "The Boo Crew TV" with the theme music omitted as the series was simply re-titled "The Boo Crew".

Plot
The show centers on the adventures of a group of neighborhood kids of diverse ethnic cultures known as "The Boo Crew" with D-Roc as the leader, often helping each other out and going to serious situations and learning a lesson in morals. The show features an abstract voice cast starring most of the Wayans family with the animation having some similarity to other black-centered shows such as The Proud Family. The show has a structure combination of African-American cultural endurance and adoration with ending music videos similar to Fat Albert and the Cosby Kids and the kid-centered oriented program synopsis on young love and romance commonly found in the classic Peanuts cartoon specials.

Characters

The Boo Crew
D-Roc: The leader of the Boo Crew who wishes to be a successful rapper. Without his hat or bandana, he reveals to have a large, balding head. He always plots the get rich quick schemes. A running gag is that when he raps, for some reasons, he forgets a word to rhyme with one of his dialogue and an angry off-screen listener throws a tomato or pie at his face shouting "It's (rhyming word), STUPID!" and driving off. 
Dee-Dee: D-Roc's loud-mouthed sister who wants to be the first female president. She has a crush on DJ. 
Darren "DJ" Jobeley III: A white boy who acts gangster with his friends but acts like a royal mannered boy to his sophisticated parents (Yo, whasup, B? How ya feelin'? What's going on, yo? Let's bounce, son). As his name implies, he is a mixmaster and carries his own turntable and boombox. He also claims to be mixed and believes that he is half-black often getting offended and aggravated of how black people were treated in the past.
Lissette: A Latina girl who wishes to be a singer. She has a crush on D-Roc. She carries her youngest brother Luiz around in the stroller. She is a skilled master at jump rope. Slim likes her but she does not reciprocate those feelings.
Slim: An overweight boy, despite his name, likes eating and speaks in a slurred voice. He has a crush on Lissette. 
Dirty: A filthy boy who speaks in a gibberish language often translated by the other gang and says "You heard me?" at the end of each sentence. He wears a sneaker necklace and the only thing that's clean is the sneakers that he wears. He is the master at beatboxing often doing it for the kids' raps.
Money: D-Roc's pet dog who can talk. He is seen wearing a baseball cap and red sneakers. When D-Roc gives him dog food, he ships it to Africa where they use it to build more houses similar to cement or mud. He also eats D-Roc's homework. His voice is modeled after the late rapper DMX.
Gwenny: An eco-friendly valley girl who loves the environment by protesting against anything made by manufacturing that harms animals; even though she litters by throwing spray cans on the floor, though she does never notice and wears a fur coat, but uses the weather as an excuse. 
Chad: A skater punk and Gwenny's younger brother who likes skateboarding and is the misfit of the gang because he always suffers all misfortunes such as getting a broken arm or falling in a trash can. He is almost never seen without his helmet and skateboard.
Soo Young: An Asian girl whose father owns many jobs and can create anything with her ideas. For some reasons, she helps D-Roc for his get rich quick schemes and acts harsh so people can work faster. 
 Baby Luiz: Lissette's youngest brother who she carries in the stroller and is mostly seen with his blue pacifier and hanging on to his crotch. Despite his age, he begins 1st grade, wears a toupee, shaves and can already talk and rap; but in Spanish unlike his bilingual sister.

Adults
 Momma: D-Roc's cheapskate mother who likes talking on the incredibly long-wired telephone, which she even takes with her in the mall. She is still married as revealed in the Christmas special telling D-Roc that his father is still sleeping.
 Principal Eyeverson: Also known as Principal Wanderingeye, he is the nearsighted principal at the Boo School who has a lazy eye and has trouble seeing or telling people apart but is very kind and generous.
 Miss Attitude: A lady often speaking in the megaphone (with her lips visible) in charge of the summer program, a mall and as the public speaker announcer in the school often complaining about her job talking care of the Boo Crew for the summer. A similar women (or maybe the same person) appeared later in the special calling D-Roc to the principal's office to order his bootlegged Air Johnsons for her and her kids.
 Darren Jobeley, Jr.: DJ's sophisticated father speaking in a royal mannerism and has bridge nights.
 Jared: A dim-witted basketball player who never passed the 3rd grade but is a talented athlete. He is a parody of Michael Jordan.
 Lee Young: Soo Young's rich father who owns a taxi service, dry cleaning business, sushi restaurant and a grocery store called "Foo's Fruits". Despite being tired, him with only one job would make him a lazy beggar. He is nice enough to offer snacks of raw fish to D-Roc and proceeds to eat them whole if they decline.
 Joyce: A rival with Momma who lost to the bargain fight sale. She may also fight with Momma in the upcoming Thanksgiving sale.
 Mr. Johnson: Diane's father and the owner of the supermarket who sells Air Johnsons.

Other characters
 Diane Johnson: A mixed-race girl and classmate of D-Roc who she is in a relationship with. Her father is the owner of Johnson's Supermarket who produced the Air Johnsons shoes which no one bought and liked D-Roc for being the first customer to actually buy them and love them. 
 O. Jenkins: A native African who frequently receives the dog food that Money keeps shipping to him and his tribe, which they use to build their houses. At one point, D-Roc tried to send them his Air Johnsons' but they returned them due to its uselessness for the tribe and they even dislike the look of it.
 Big Kid: A largest boy with a name drop "HELLO! MY NAME IS BIG KID!" on his overalls whose face is hidden and was accused by Dee Dee of cutting in line and threatened to rip D-Roc's face off. D-Roc was horrified of his size and corrects him by saying that she did not say "cut in line", she said "we cut the price in half, read the sign" accompanied by creating a sign to prove its case, promoting him to get angrier by ripping D-Roc's face off because he can't see the sign due to his height. He does neither like to be accused of anything nor does he like to be lied to, which influences him to fight. A running gag for the characters' appearance is that Dee Dee would report to D-Roc about him being an "itty-bitty boy" who cut in line and threatened to beat up D-Roc if he saw him. At first, D-Roc curiously asks Dee Dee if the culprit was the feeble, nerdy white kid that was next to him but Dee Dee corrects him and points at the Big Kid, intimidating D-Roc the moment he sees him. Every time the situation occurs, the Big Kid reveals that the accusations reminds him of a similar scenario with his mother such as his mother accusing him of being born ugly, and he discovered that his mother lied about the existence of the tooth fairy right when he knocked all his teeth out. Whenever he ends hurting D-Roc, he runs home crying to his mother. On the Christmas special, he knocks D-Roc's skeleton out of his body before running.
 Gavin: A poverted-kid whose parents are unemployed but wished for a G-Bot to Mall Santa. The Boo Crew donated several of their gifts to him, including D-Roc's G-bot.
 Freddy Stickler: An older kid with huge buck-teeth and braces who, alongside his friend Sean Donovan, tend to pick on younger kids. When D-Roc confront him about his bullying by mocking his teeth, they settle it by playing the dozens, in its figurative and literal meaning by also drawing down cards.

Voice cast 
 George O. Gore II - D Roc
 Countess Vaughn - Dee Dee
 Shawn Wayans - Slim, Cheapie
 Marlon Wayans - Dirty, Money ("A Boo Crew Christmas")
 Linda Villalobos - Lisette, Spanish Voice
 Michael Rapaport - DJ ("Sneaker Madness")
 Eric Schwartz - DJ ("A Boo Crew Christmas")
 Nancy Lee - Soo Young
 Heather McDonald - Gwenny, Gavin's Mom
 Johnny Abrams - Chad
 Kim Wayans - Momma, Joycee
 David Alan Grier - Principal Eyeverson, Man Upstairs, Africans
 Charlie Murphy - Big Kid
 Aries Spears - Money ("Sneaker Madness"), Africans, Jay-Z
 Linden Porco - Gavin
 Bobby Lee - Mr. Lee Young, William Hung
 Kym Whitley - Ms. Attitude
 John Witherspoon - Real Santa, Singer on Radio
 Karl Kehr - Simon
 Michael Anthony Snowden - Basketball Player, Angry Parent
 Kevin Knotts - Superman, DJ's Dad
 Buddy Johnson - Outside Voice, Heckler
 Chaunté Wayans - Diane Johnson
 Craig Wayans - Man Upstairs Jr., Freddy Stickler
 Shane Miller - Sean Donovan, Soap Opera Actor
 Skye Wayans - Kid #2
 Jared Edwards - Angry Parent
 Lochlyn Munro - Gavin's Dad

Specials 
 The Boo Crew: "Sneaker Madness" - When D-Roc sees a pair of expensive sneakers called Air Jareds (a parody of Air Jordans), he wants his mother to buy them to wear at school in order to look cool. His mother purchases a cheaper priced pair of Air Johnsons instead. Afraid of looking bad to his crew, D-Roc asks Soo-Young to make Air Jareds out of Air Johnsons and when they work out well, they realize they can make money by converting the shoes. Their plan to make money eventually goes wary and D-Roc is taught a lesson about being himself.
 The Boo Crew: "A Boo Crew Christmas: A Miracle on D-Roc Street" -  D-Roc, Dee-Dee, DJ, Money, Lissette, Slim, Chad, Gwenny, Soo Young (also known as The Boo Crew) are working together to find a way to bring the true meaning of Christmas home to less fortunate young Gavin and his family.

Music 
The Boo Crew has premiered two music videos using characters from the specials, "Just Be U" and "Gimmie Gimmie." Similar to another black-centered series, Fat Albert and the Cosby Kids, it teaches about moral lessons and virtues.

References

External links 
 Official Boo Crew website
 
 

2006 television specials
2000s American television specials
2000s animated television specials
2000s American black cartoons
Hip hop television